Major General Sanaullah Khan Niazi  (Pashto,  (1960 – September 15, 2013) was a two-star rank general in the Pakistan Army who was killed in a roadside IED blast. At the time of his death, he was serving as General Officer Commanding 17 Division, Malakand. He posthumously received the Sitara-e-Basalat in 2014.

Early life 
He was born in 1960 to a Niazi family.

Military career
In 1983 at the age of 23, he was commissioned into the army in the Baloch Regiment.

Personal life
Sanaullah was married and had two daughters.

Death
Major General Sanaullah Niazi and Lieutenant Colonel Touseef Ahmed were visiting troop posts in the Upper Dir District of northwestern Khyber Pakhtunkhwa, along the Afghan border, when their vehicle drove over a bomb planted by the Pakistani Taliban killing them along with their driver, Lance Naik Irfan Sattar and injuring two others who were later evacuated.

The terrorist who planted the bomb was later arrested and given the death sentence by COAS Qamar Javed Bajwa on 15 December 2018.

References 

1960 births
2013 deaths
Pakistani military personnel killed in action
Pakistan Army officers
Pakistani generals
Imran Khan family
Pashtun people
Pakistani Muslims
Terrorism victims
Pakistani terrorism victims
Victims of the Tehrik-i-Taliban Pakistan
Pakistan Military Academy alumni
Niazi family